Campylophyllum is a genus of mosses belonging to the family Hypnaceae.

The genus was first described by Wilhelm Philippe Schimper.

The species of this genus are found in Europe and America.

Species:
 Campylophyllum calcareum
 Campylophyllum halleri
 Campylophyllum sommerfeltii

References

Hypnales
Moss genera